The Last Musketeer is a 1952 American Western film directed by William Witney and written by Arthur E. Orloff. The film stars Rex Allen (with Koko the Miracle Horse), Mary Ellen Kay, Slim Pickens, James Anderson, Boyd Morgan and Monte Montague. The film was released on March 1, 1952, by Republic Pictures.

Plot
A greedy rancher is charging excessive prices for access to the area's only water supply, extorting the smaller ranchers in the area. A water diviner teams up with a cattle buyer to force the villain to share the water with his neighbors.

Cast
Rex Allen as Rex Allen
Koko as Koko
Mary Ellen Kay as Sue
Slim Pickens as Slim Pickens
James Anderson as Russ Tasker
Boyd Morgan as Barney
Monte Montague as Matt Becker
Michael Hall as Johnny Becker
Al Bridge as Lem Shaver
Stan Jones as Sheriff Blake
The Republic Rhythm Riders as Musicians / Cowhands

References

External links 
 

1952 films
American Western (genre) films
1952 Western (genre) films
Republic Pictures films
Films directed by William Witney
Films scored by Nathan Scott
American black-and-white films
1950s English-language films
1950s American films